Descending branch may refer to:

 Anterior descending branch of the profunda brachii artery, also known as the radial collateral artery
 Descending branch of lateral circumflex femoral artery
 Descending branch of occipital artery